Song Seung-hwan is a South Korean actor. He is known for his roles in dramas such as My Kids Give Me a Headache, Racket Boys, All About My Mom, One Spring Night and Three Bold Siblings. He also appeared in movies The Memo Of A 21-Year-Old, A Peculiar Woman, The Box and The Moon Is... the Sun's Dream.

Filmography

Television series

Film

Ambassadorship 
 Jeju Special Self-Governing Province Cultural Ambassador in 2009
 Salvation Army Charity Pot Ambassador in 2012

Awards and nominations

State honors

References

External links 
 
 

1957 births
20th-century South Korean male actors
Living people
21st-century South Korean male actors
South Korean male television actors
South Korean male film actors